Artemi Viktorovich Lakiza (born July 2, 1987) is a Russian born Kazakhstani professional ice hockey defenceman. He is currently playing for HC Almaty in the Kazakhstan Hockey Championship (KAZ). He has formerly played with top tier Kazakh club, Barys Astana in the Kontinental Hockey League (KHL).

External links

1987 births
Living people
Sportspeople from Barnaul
HC Almaty players
Barys Nur-Sultan players
Kazakhmys Satpaev players
Nomad Astana players
Kazakhstani ice hockey defencemen
Asian Games gold medalists for Kazakhstan
Medalists at the 2017 Asian Winter Games
Asian Games medalists in ice hockey
Ice hockey players at the 2017 Asian Winter Games